Perth is a town in the Australian state of Tasmania. The town had a population of 2,965 at the 2016 census, and is part of the Northern Midlands Council.

Like nearby Longford, Perth is a historic town with many buildings dating back to the early 19th century. It is the first major town out of Launceston on the route to Hobart, and also serves as a major junction for people bypassing Launceston on the route from Hobart to the northwest of the state.

History
Perth was settled in 1821 by Governor Lachlan Macquarie. He was staying nearby with the pastoralist David Gibson and named it after Gibson's hometown of Perth, Scotland. It was proclaimed as a township in 1836.
John Skinner Prout painted a view of the town in 1845, with various parts of the inland mountains showing in the painting.  Edward Paxham Brandard engraved the picture in 1874.

Landmarks

Baptist church 
The Perth Baptist church, opened in 1862, is notable, due to its history, size and architecture.

Gibbet Hill 

In 1837, five years after the practice ceased in England, the body of John McKay was gibbetted near the spot where he murdered Joseph Wilson near Perth. There was great outcry, but the body was not removed until an acquaintance of Wilson passed the spot and, horrified by the spectacle of McKay's rotting corpse, pleaded with the authorities to remove it.

The location is still marked by a sign reading, "Gibbet Hill" on the right when heading to Launceston.

This was the last case of gibbeting in a British colony.

References

External links

Map showing Perth's location and that of Gibbet Hill (maps.google.com.au)

Localities of Northern Midlands Council
Northern Tasmania
1821 establishments in Australia